() was a rank and the highest military office in the Wehrmacht specially created for Hermann Göring during World War II.

History
At the beginning of World War II, the only active holder of that rank was Hermann Göring, Commander-in-Chief of the Luftwaffe. During the same ceremony, Göring was promoted to the newly created rank of Reichsmarschall to placate his thirst for prestige and to highlight his position as senior to the other Wehrmacht commanders, without giving him any actual authority over them.

Earlier, on the day Germany invaded Poland, Hitler designated Göring as his successor, a status underscored by a 1941 decree that empowered Göring to act as Hitler's deputy with full freedom of action in the event Hitler was incapacitated. Nevertheless, on 23 April 1945, when Göring suggested to Hitler that he assume leadership of the crumbling remains of Nazi Germany, Hitler relieved Göring of his duties and named a new successor in his last will and testament, Grand Admiral Karl Dönitz. Dönitz's appointment was made on or before the day of Hitler's suicide.

Standards

Uniform

Notes

References

Bibliography

German words and phrases
Marshals of Germany
Military of Nazi Germany
Military ranks of Germany